The Episcopal Diocese of East Carolina is a diocese of the Episcopal Church in the United States that covers most of eastern North Carolina. The diocese was formed from the existing Diocese of North Carolina on October 9, 1883, by action of the General Convention of the Episcopal Church. It consists of the congregations of the Episcopal Church in the eastern portion of the state of North Carolina and forms part of Province IV of the Episcopal Church. Major cities of the diocese include Wilmington, Fayetteville, New Bern, and Greenville. Originally its offices were located in Wilmington, but in 1983 a new diocesan house was built in Kinston, North Carolina, in order to be located more centrally in the diocese's territory. The diocese's current bishop is Robert Skirving.

List of bishops

References

External links
 Episcopal Diocese of East Carolina website
 Journal of the Annual Council of the Protestant Episcopal Church in the Diocese of East Carolina a comprehensive listing of the proceedings of the diocesan convention from 1883 to 2009, with the exception of 2006.

East Carolina
Diocese of East Carolina
Religious organizations established in 1883
Anglican dioceses established in the 19th century
Province 4 of the Episcopal Church (United States)